Omnibook Magazine was published from 1938 until 1957 by Omnibook Inc. in New York.  It was edited by Maxwell M. Geffen and Victor W. Knauth and featured "authorized abridgements of current best-selling books."

References

Defunct literary magazines published in the United States
Magazines established in 1938
Magazines disestablished in 1957
Magazines published in New York City